The Cleveland Comets were a women's professional softball team based in Cleveland, Ohio. Founded by General Manager, Stephen Dunn. They moved to Cleveland from Akron, Ohio, in 2018. The Comets played as a member of National Pro Fastpitch (NPF) and had a partnership with the Mexico women's national softball team.

Current players

References

Cleveland Comets
Softball teams in the United States
Sports teams in Cleveland
National Pro Fastpitch teams
Sports clubs established in 2018
2018 establishments in Ohio